A varix (pl. varices) is an abnormally dilated vessel with a tortuous course. Varices usually occur in the venous system, but may also occur in arterial or lymphatic vessels.

Examples of varices include:
 Varicose veins, large tortuous veins usually found on legs
 Sublingual varices
 Esophageal varices, commonly stemming from cirrhosis of the liver, also known as oesophageal varicose
 Gastric varices, commonly stemming from cirrhosis of the liver
 Intestinal varices
 Scrotal varices
 Vulvar varices
 Pelvic varices
 Vesical varices, varicose veins associated with the urinary bladder
 Rectal varices, which can be similar to external haemorrhoids

See also
 Varicose ulcer
 Varix (mollusc)

References

Diseases of veins, lymphatic vessels and lymph nodes